Retno Lestari Priansari Marsudi (born 27 November 1962) is an Indonesian diplomat who has been serving as the Minister for Foreign Affairs in the Cabinet of Joko Widodo since 2014. She is the first female minister appointed to the post. She was previously the Indonesian Ambassador to the Netherlands from 2012 to 2014, as well as Ambassador to Iceland and Norway from 2005 to 2008.

Early life and education
Born in Semarang, Marsudi graduated from SMAN 3 Semarang and continued her study in International Relations, graduating from Gadjah Mada University in 1985. She then pursued a Master's degree in International European Law & Policy at The Hague University of Applied Science and followed the Foreign Ministry training program at the Netherlands Institute of International Relations Clingendael.

Career in the diplomatic service
Marsudi joined the Ministry of Foreign Affairs from university. Between 1997 and 2001, Marsudi served as First Secretary for Economic Affairs at the Indonesian Embassy in The Hague, Netherlands. In 2001, she was appointed as Director of Europe and America Affairs. Marsudi was promoted to Director of West Europe Affairs in 2003.

In 2005, Marsudi was appointed as the Indonesian Ambassador to Norway and Iceland. During her tenure, she was awarded the Royal Norwegian Order of Merit in December 2011, the first Indonesian to receive the award. She also briefly took up study of human rights at the University of Oslo. Marsudi returned to Jakarta and was appointed Director General for European and American Affairs.

Marsudi was appointed as Indonesian Ambassador to the Netherlands in 2011 by President Susilo Bambang Yudhoyono. She has also led various multilateral negotiations and bilateral consultations with the EU, ASEM, and FEALAC.

Political career

On 27 October 2014, Marsudi was appointed Minister of Foreign Affairs by President Joko Widodo in his Working Cabinet.

In 2021, Marsudi was appointed co-chair – alongside Karina Gould and Lia Tadesse – of the COVAX Advance Market Commitment (AMC) Engagement Group; the AMC is a financing instrument established to support the participation of 92 lower-middle and low-income economies in the COVAX Facility and ensure their access to COVID-19 vaccines.

Honours
: Medal of Malalai (2020)
: Grand Cross of the Order of the Sun of Peru (2018)

See also
List of foreign ministers in 2017
List of current foreign ministers
List of female foreign ministers

References

External links

1962 births
Living people
Foreign ministers of Indonesia
Ambassadors of Indonesia to the Netherlands
Ambassadors of Indonesia to Iceland
Ambassadors of Indonesia to Norway
Female foreign ministers
Indonesian women diplomats
Women government ministers of Indonesia
Javanese people
Gadjah Mada University alumni
People from Semarang
Women ambassadors
Working Cabinet (Joko Widodo)
Onward Indonesia Cabinet
The Hague University of Applied Sciences alumni